The 2002 Brisbane Broncos season was the fifteenth in the club's history. They competed in the NRL's 2002 Telstra Premiership and finished the regular season in third position before going on to again come within one match of the grand final for the second consecutive year.

Season summary 
The 2002 NRL season saw the return of club legend Allan Langer to the Brisbane Broncos, following his successful comeback to Australian rugby league in the previous year's State of Origin decider. In 2002 he was the NRL's oldest player at 36 years and 60 days.

2002 was also the beginning of Brisbane's recurring "post origin slump", which was to haunt the club for the next four years. As most of the Queensland Maroons who compete in the mid-week State of Origin matches are Broncos' players, this extra workload often results in a loss of form for the club around and after the time of the Origin series. The Broncos finished the regular season in 3rd position, with the second-highest points differential in the league, but were knocked out in the Preliminary Final by the eventual premiers, the Sydney Roosters, in a rematch of the 2000 Grand Final.

One season highlight was the week 12 upset of Wests Tigers. Despite finishing the season down the ladder the Tigers were in a finals spot at the time. With nine players selected for Origin, Brisbane played six debutants, including Corey Parker, Scott Prince and Shaun Berrigan, ultimately defeating the Tigers 28–14.

Match results 

 *Game following a State of Origin match

Ladder

Scorers

Honours

League 
 Nil

Club 
 Player of the year: Darren Lockyer
 Rookie of the year: Brent Tate
 Back of the year: Darren Lockyer
 Forward of the year: Shane Webcke
 Club man of the year: Scott Prince

References

External links 
 Brisbane Broncos 2002 at sportsphotography.net

Brisbane Broncos seasons
Brisbane Broncos season